Born to Love is a 1983 studio album of duets by American singers Peabo Bryson and Roberta Flack. It was released by Bryson's label Capitol Records on July 22, 1983 in the United States. The album yielded the hit single "Tonight, I Celebrate My Love", written by Gerry Goffin and Michael Masser. The track "Maybe" was written and recorded for the film Romantic Comedy (1983).

Critical reception

AllMusic editor Rob Theakston called Born to Love "not an essential album by any means, but nonetheless an enjoyable listen."

Track listing

Personnel 
Musicians

 Roberta Flack – lead vocals, backing vocals (9)
 Peabo Bryson – lead vocals, backing vocals (4)
 Randy Kerber – Fender Rhodes (1)
 Michael Boddicker – synthesizers (2, 5)
 Greg Phillinganes – acoustic piano (2, 5)
 Paul Delph – Prophet-10 programming (3), Prophet-10 (6)
 Bob Gaudio – acoustic piano (3), Rhodes piano (3), Prophet-10 (3), programming (3), LinnDrum (3), arrangements (3, 6, 8), vocal arrangements (3, 6, 8), synthesizers (6, 8)
 Mark Parrish – Oberheim OB-X (4), Prophet-5 (4)
 Vance Taylor – Fender Rhodes (4), Oberheim OB-X (4), Synclavier (4)
 Jai Winding – Rhodes piano (6), arrangements (6, 8)
 Robbie Buchanan – keyboards (7), synthesizers (7), strings (7), arrangements (7)
 Jerry Corbetta – Fender Rhodes (8), Prophet-10 (8), synthesizer solo (8), arrangements (8)
 Richard Tee – keyboards (9)
 Marcus Miller – synthesizers (9), bass (9)
 Paul Jackson Jr. – guitar (1, 2, 5)
 Dann Huff – guitar (2, 5)
 John Hauser – guitar (4)
 Richard Horton – guitar (4), guitar synthesizer (4)
 Tim May – guitar (6), acoustic guitar (8), electric guitar (8)
 Georg Wadenius – guitar (9)
 Nathan East – bass (1, 7)
 Abraham Laboriel – bass (2, 5)
 Leland Sklar – bass (6, 8)
 Carlos Vega – drums (1, 6, 7, 8)
 Jim Keltner – drums (2, 5)
 John Gilston – Simmons drums (3)
 Andre Robinson – drums (4)
 Paulinho da Costa – percussion (2, 5)
 Charles Bryson – percussion (4)
 Bobbye Hall – bongos (8), congas (8)
 Anthony MacDonald – percussion (9)
 Pete Christlieb – saxophone solo (3, 6)
 Ron Dover – tenor saxophone (4), backing vocals (4)
 Daniel Dillard – trumpet (4)
 Thaddeus Johnson – trumpet (4), flugelhorn (4)
 Felipe Mantine – flute (9)
 Michael Masser – rhythm arrangements (1)
 Gene Page – rhythm arrangements (1), orchestration (1), strings (7)
 Frank DeCaro – music contractor (2, 5)
 Mary Bridges – backing vocals (3)
 Jim Gilstrap – backing vocals (3)
 Patricia Hall – backing vocals (3)
 Luther Waters – backing vocals (3)
 Oren Waters – backing vocals (3)
 Mona Lisa Young – backing vocals (3, 6, 8)
 Terry Young – backing vocals (3, 6, 8)
 Myra Walker – backing vocals (4)
 Dwight W. Watkins – backing vocals (4)
 Shirley Brewer – backing vocals (6, 8)
 Al Johnson – backing vocals (9), arrangements (9)

Production

 Don Grierson – executive producer
 Varnell Johnson – executive producer
 Michael Masser – producer (1, 7)
 Burt Bacharach – producer (2, 5)
 Carole Bayer Sager – producer (2, 5)
 Bob Crewe – producer (3, 6, 8)
 Bob Gaudio – producer (3, 6, 8)
 Peabo Bryson – producer (4)
 Ed Seay – assistant producer (4), engineer (4)
 Roberta Flack – producer (9)
 Al Johnson – associate producer (9)
 Jeremy Smith – engineer (1, 7)
 Howard Wolin – engineer (1, 7)
 Bruce Swedien – engineer (2, 5)
 Tony D'Amico – engineer (3, 6, 8), recording (3, 6, 8), mixing (8)
 Jay Messina – vocal recording (3, 6, 8)
 Tom Swift – vocal recording assistant (3, 6, 8)
 Eric Calvi – first engineer (9)
 Kendall Brown – second engineer (9)
 Steve Marcantonio – recording (9)
 Dick Bogart – mixing (1, 7)
 Russ Terrano – mixing (1, 7)
 Lee DeCarlo – mixing (3, 6)
 Jim Bell – mix assistant (3, 6, 8), assistant engineer (8), recording assistant (8)
 Roy Kohara – art direction 
 John O'Brien – design 
 Beverly Parker – photography
 Lamarries Moses – stylist 
 Roger St. Pierre – liner notes

Studios

 Recorded at Record Plant (New York, NY); Westlake Studios and New Sound Labs (Los Angeles, CA); Studio Sound Recorders (North Hollywood, CA); A&M Studios and Music Grinder Studios (Hollywood, CA).
 Mixed at Record Plant; New Sound Labs; Motown / Hitsville U.S.A. Recording Studios (Hollywood, CA).

Charts

Certifications

References

Peabo Bryson albums
Roberta Flack albums
1983 albums
Albums produced by Michael Masser
Albums produced by Bob Crewe
Capitol Records albums
Collaborative albums